, known from 2012 to 2016 as , is a Japanese footballer who plays as a striker for National Women's Soccer League (NWSL) club Chicago Red Stars. She is the first female footballer to play for the first-team of a Japanese men's club.

Nagasato represented Japan internationally between 2004 and 2016, scoring 58 goals in 132 caps. She has won the FIFA Women's World Cup in 2011, and came second in 2015.

Club career
Nagasato was born in Atsugi on 15 July 1987. In 2001, she was promoted to Nippon TV Beleza from her youth team. In the 2002 season, she debuted in L.League. She became one of the division's top scorers in 2006 season. She also won the league championship 6 times (2001, 2002, 2005, 2006, 2007 and 2008).

In 2010, Nagasato moved to Turbine Potsdam in Germany, where she won the Bundesliga's leading goal-scorer award. She also won the UEFA Champions League with that team. In 2013, she transferred to the English FA WSL club Chelsea.

She joined Wolfsburg in early 2015 to play in a stronger league for the 2015 World Cup. In August 2015, Nagasato joined UEFA Champions League 2015 winners Frankfurt.

On 24 May 2017 it was announced that she had signed with the Chicago Red Stars of the National Women's Soccer League (NWSL), she appeared in only 6 games in 2017 due to injury. In 2018 she was named Player of the Week for week 10 

In October 2018, Nagasato signed with Brisbane Roar on loan for the 2018–19 W-League season.

On 10 September 2020, Nagasato made history by becoming the first woman to play for Hayabusa Eleven, a men's team in the Kanagawa Prefecture League; she joined on loan until prior to the beginning of the 2021 NWSL season.

On 26 October 2020, newly-formed club Racing Louisville FC announced Nagasato as one of their first signings for the 2021 National Women's Soccer League season.

On 11 January 2022, the Red Stars announced that Nagasato would be returning to Chicago.

International career
In April 2004, Nagasato was selected Japan national team for 2004 Summer Olympics qualification. At this competition, on 22 April, she debuted against Thailand. She was also part of Japan's 2008 Summer Olympic team and 2007 World Cup. Nagasato was part of the Japan squad that won the 2011 World Cup. She played as a substitute in the final against the United States. The game went to penalties and Nagasato had her penalty saved by Hope Solo, but Japan still emerged victorious.

Since 2016, she wore the number 10 shirt for Japan, after Homare Sawa retired at 2016 AFC Women's Olympic Qualifying Tournament. After the tournament, new Japan's manager Asako Takakura gave the number 10 to Mizuho Sakaguchi and Nagasato wore the number 9.

Personal life
Nagasato's brother Genki is a professional footballer, and her younger sister Asano also played for Turbine Potsdam.

Nagasato married in July 2011 and changed her registered name from Nagasato to Ōgimi before the 2012 Summer Olympics. Upon her divorce in 2016, she re-assumed her maiden name.

Career statistics

Club

International

International goals

Honours

Club
Nippon TV Beleza
L.League: 2002, 2005, 2008
Empress's Cup: 2005, 2006, 2008, 2010
Nadeshiko League Cup: 2007

1. FFC Turbine Potsdam
Bundesliga: 2010, 2011
UEFA Champions League: 2010

VfL Wolfsburg
DFB Pokal: 2014–15

International
Japan
FIFA Women's World Cup: 2011; runner-up: 2015
East Asian Football Championship: 2008
Summer Olympic Games runner-up: 2012

Individual
Performances
L.League top-goalscorer: 2006
L-League Best Eleven: 2005, 2006
Bundesliga top-goalscorer: 2013

See also
 List of women's footballers with 100 or more international caps

References

External links

Japan Football Association
 
 
 

1987 births
Living people
Japanese women's footballers
Japan women's international footballers
Footballers at the 2008 Summer Olympics
Footballers at the 2012 Summer Olympics
Olympic footballers of Japan
1. FFC Turbine Potsdam players
Chelsea F.C. Women players
Women's Super League players
2007 FIFA Women's World Cup players
2011 FIFA Women's World Cup players
2015 FIFA Women's World Cup players
Japanese expatriates in Germany
Olympic silver medalists for Japan
Olympic medalists in football
Medalists at the 2012 Summer Olympics
FIFA Century Club
Expatriate women's footballers in Germany
Expatriate women's footballers in England
Japanese expatriate sportspeople in England
Sportspeople from Kanagawa Prefecture
Nippon TV Tokyo Verdy Beleza players
Nadeshiko League players
VfL Wolfsburg (women) players
Women's association football forwards
1. FFC Frankfurt players
Chicago Red Stars players
Brisbane Roar FC (A-League Women) players
Expatriate women's soccer players in the United States
Japanese expatriate sportspeople in the United States
Asian Games medalists in football
Footballers at the 2006 Asian Games
Asian Games silver medalists for Japan
National Women's Soccer League players
Medalists at the 2006 Asian Games
FIFA Women's World Cup-winning players
Racing Louisville FC players